Seonaid McIntosh (born 15 March 1996) is a British sports shooter who became the World Champion at the 2018 ISSF World Shooting Championships in the 50m Prone Rifle event. In 2019 she became Britain's most successful female Rifle Shooter of all time, winning three World Cup medals (including the first World Cup Gold to be won by a British Woman), becoming the first British Woman to rank World #1 for the 50m Rifle Three Position event and becoming European Champion in the 300m Rifle Prone event with an equal World Record score. McIntosh is the daughter of four-times Commonwealth Games medalist Shirley McIntosh and Donald McIntosh, and younger sister of British Olympic Shooter Jennifer McIntosh. In 2017 she won the Women's 3x20 Rifle event at the 2017 European Shooting Championships in Baku, becoming European Champion. Sister Jennifer had also won the Women's 50m Prone Rifle earlier in the week, becoming European Champion in that event.

Career
Seonaid shot at school (Dollar Academy) and club level and did not harbour international ambitions until sister Jennifer's success at the 2010 Commonwealth Games and attendance at the 2012 Summer Olympics. Whilst a pupil at Dollar Academy she was a member of the school's winning 2013 team in the NRA's Ashburton Shield, as well as individually winning the School's Hundred that year.

After beginning training in earnest in November 2012, she placed 11th in the Junior Women's 50 Metre Prone Rifle at the ISSF World Shooting Championships – her first major international. At the 2015 10M European Championships in Arnhem she won Silver in the Junior Women's 10 metre Air Rifle, making her the first British Junior in 35 years to medal at a European Championship, and setting a new British Under-21s Record.

At the 2014 Commonwealth Games, she competed in the 10 metre air rifle event, placing 19th.

In November 2017, Seonaid was selected for Scotland's team for the 2018 Commonwealth Games At the Games she qualified in the 10m Air Rifle in 7th place, placing 5th in the Final. In the 50m Prone Rifle she won the Bronze medal, and in the 50m Rifle Three Positions qualified 6th, working up to win the Bronze medal in the Final.
As of 2016 was Seonaid enrolled on the British Shooting World Class Performance Programme, working towards Tokyo 2020.

At the 2018 ISSF World Shooting Championships, McIntosh won the Women's Prone 50m Rifle event becoming World Champion, she went on to place fourth in the Women's 3x40 Rifle, earning a Quota Place for the 2020 Summer Olympics in Tokyo.

In May 2019 McIntosh won a Silver medal at the Munich leg of the 2019 ISSF World Cup in the Women's 3x40 Rifle event, earning herself a place at the World Cup Final. She was not allocated an Olympic Quota Place however having already won one at the World Championships. This was the first Rifle World Cup Medal a GB shooter had won since Kenneth Parr won a Silver Medal for Prone in the 2016 ISSF World Cup, and the first Women's medal since Louise Minett won a Silver in 10m Air Rifle at the 1999 Atlanta World Cup.

In August at the Rio de Janeiro leg of the World Cup McIntosh won Silver in the Women's 10m Air Rifle. She went on to win Gold in the Women's 3x40 Rifle, becoming the first British Woman to win a World Cup Gold Medal. This result moved her from fourth to first in the ISSF World Rankings for Three Position Rifle in the September 2019 Rankings, making her the first British Woman to be ranked World #1.

At the European Championships in September 2019 Seonaid won Bronze in the 50m Prone Rifle Mixed Team (Pairs) event with teammate Kenneth Parr. She went on to win Gold in the 300m Prone Rifle, equalling the World Record with a score of 599(ex600).

When the British team's were announced for the postponed 2020 Summer Olympics in Tokyo, McIntosh was included. The other British women shooters bound for Tokyo are Olympian Kirsty Hegarty (women’s Olympic trap) and Paralympians Lorraine Lambert, Issy Bailey and Lesley Stewart.

In February 2023, McIntosh won the 10m Air Rifle event at the second stage of the 2023 ISSF World Cup in Cairo. This made her the first British athlete to win a World Cup Gold Medal in the air rifle event. Her qualification score of 634.0 was a Personal Best and new British Record.

In March 2023 she won silver at the European 10Metre Championships in Tallinn, Estonia. This earned British Shooting a quota place to the 2024 Olympic Games in Paris.

References

External links

1996 births
Living people
British female sport shooters
ISSF rifle shooters
People educated at Dollar Academy
Scottish female sport shooters
Shooters at the 2014 Commonwealth Games
Sportspeople from Edinburgh
Shooters at the 2015 European Games
European Games competitors for Great Britain
Commonwealth Games medallists in shooting
Commonwealth Games bronze medallists for Scotland
Shooters at the 2019 European Games
Olympic shooters of Great Britain
Shooters at the 2020 Summer Olympics
Shooters at the 2018 Commonwealth Games
Medallists at the 2018 Commonwealth Games